Cénit was a magazine which was founded by the exiled leftist Catalan political figures and published in Toulouse, France, between 1951 and 1996. Its subtitle was Revista de Sociología, Ciencia y Literatura (Spanish: Journal of Sociology, Science and Literature).

History and profle
Cénit was launched in 1951 by the Spanish political exiles who had left Spain following the capture of Barcelona by the Francoist forces in 1939. It was based in Toulouse and published by Confederación Nacional del Trabajo (Spanish: National Labour Confederation). From its start to 1971 the magazine came out bimonthly, and then its frequency was switched to quarterly. One of its editors was Federica Montseny. Salvador Cano Carrillo, a Spanish militant anarchist, was among the contributors. In 1954 the magazine received contributions from Benito Milla. It folded in October 1996.

References

External links
 Cover pages of the magazine at Europeana web page

1951 establishments in France
1996 disestablishments in France
Bi-monthly magazines published in France
Defunct literary magazines published in France
Francoist Spain
Magazines established in 1951
Magazines disestablished in 1996
Mass media in Toulouse
Quarterly magazines published in France
Spanish-language magazines
Sociology journals
Anarchist periodicals published in France